Romain Barnier (born 10 May 1976 in Marseille) is a freestyle swimmer from France, who won the bronze medal in the 100 m freestyle at the European Short Course Swimming Championships 2001. He competed in two consecutive Summer Olympics for his native country, starting in 2000.

After retiring from competitive swimming, he is the head swimming coach of the elite group of the Cercle des Nageurs de Marseille.

In 2017, Barnier was given a six-month suspension for anti-doping rules violations.

References

External links
 

1976 births
French male butterfly swimmers
Living people
Olympic swimmers of France
Swimmers from Marseille
Swimmers at the 2000 Summer Olympics
Swimmers at the 2004 Summer Olympics
Auburn Tigers men's swimmers
French male freestyle swimmers
World Aquatics Championships medalists in swimming
European Aquatics Championships medalists in swimming
Doping cases in swimming
Mediterranean Games gold medalists for France
Mediterranean Games bronze medalists for France
Swimmers at the 2005 Mediterranean Games
Universiade medalists in swimming
Mediterranean Games medalists in swimming
Universiade gold medalists for France
Medalists at the 2001 Summer Universiade